Mary Abigail Padgett (born May 13, 1942, in Vincennes, Indiana) is an American author of mystery novels who features in Great Women Mystery Writers (2007)

Biography
Padgett graduated in 1964 from Indiana University, Bloomington with a degree in education then earned a master's in counselling from the University of Missouri in 1969; between the two she taught high school English in St. Louis. She then had several different jobs before becoming a court investigator for Child Protective Services in San Diego, a post she left in 1988 to concentrate on writing and advocacy for children and the mentally ill.

Writing
Padgett's first series concerns Barbara "Bo" Bradley, a child protection advocate investigator in San Diego who suffers from bipolar disorder. Her second series features Blue McCarron, a reclusive lesbian social psychologist.

Padgett maintains a blog.

Bibliography

Bo Bradley series
 Child of Silence (1993)
 Strawgirl (1994)
 Turtle Baby (1995)
 Moonbird Boy (1996)
 The Dollmaker's Daughters (1997)
 Stork Boy (2019)

Blue McCarron series
 Blue (1998)
 The Last Blue Plate Special (2001)
 Ultimate Blue (2022)

Taylor Blake Magical Mystery
 The Paper Doll Museum (2012)

Morgan's Bay
  A Kiss at Morgan's Bay (2018)
  A Secret at Morgan's Bay (2018)

Other novels
 Bone Blind (2011)
 An Unremembered Grave (2014)

Collections
 Mandy Dru Mysteries (2015)

References

External links

1942 births
Living people
20th-century American novelists
21st-century American novelists
American mystery writers
American women novelists
People from Vincennes, Indiana
Novelists from Indiana
University of Missouri alumni
Indiana University alumni
Women mystery writers
20th-century American women writers
21st-century American women writers